Roberto Enrique Clemente Walker (August 18, 1934 – December 31, 1972) was a Puerto Rican professional baseball right fielder who played 18 seasons in Major League Baseball (MLB) for the Pittsburgh Pirates. After his early death, he was posthumously inducted into the National Baseball Hall of Fame in 1973, becoming both the first Caribbean and the first Latin-American player to be enshrined. Because he died at a young age and had such a historic career, the Hall of Fame changed its rules of eligibility. As an alternative to a player having to be retired for five years before eligibility, a player who has been deceased for at least six months is eligible for entry.

Clemente was an All-Star for 13 seasons, selected to 15 All-Star Games. He was the National League (NL) Most Valuable Player (MVP) in 1966, the NL batting leader in 1961, 1964, 1965, and 1967, and a Gold Glove Award winner for 12 consecutive seasons from 1961 through 1972. His batting average was over .300 for 13 seasons and he had 3,000 hits during his major league career. He also was a two-time World Series champion. Clemente was the first player from the Caribbean and Latin America to win a World Series as a starting position player (1960), to receive an NL MVP Award (1966), and to receive a World Series MVP Award (1971).

Clemente was involved in charity work in Latin American and Caribbean countries during the off-seasons. He often delivered baseball equipment and food to those in need. In 1972, he died in a plane crash at the age of 38 while en route to deliver aid to victims of the Nicaragua earthquake. The following season, the Pirates retired his uniform number 21, and MLB renamed its annual Commissioner's Award in his honor. Now known as the Roberto Clemente Award, it is given to the player who "best exemplifies the game of baseball, sportsmanship, community involvement and the individual's contribution to his team."

Early life 
Roberto was born in Barrio San Antón, Carolina, Puerto Rico, to Melchor Clemente and Luisa Walker. He was the youngest of seven children. During Clemente's childhood, his father worked as a foreman for sugar cane crops located in the municipality, located in the northeastern part of the island. Because the family's resources were limited, Clemente and his brothers worked alongside his father in the fields, loading and unloading trucks. As a youth, Clemente was a track and field star and Olympic hopeful before deciding to turn his attention to baseball.

Clemente had first shown interest in baseball early in life and often played against neighboring barrios. He attended Julio Vizcarrondo Coronado High School in Carolina. During his first year in high school, he was recruited by Roberto Marín to play softball with the Sello Rojo team after he was seen playing baseball in barrio San Antón. He was with the team two years as a shortstop.

Clemente joined Puerto Rico's amateur league when he was 16 years old, playing for the Ferdinand Juncos team, which represented the municipality of Juncos.

Puerto Rican baseball (1952–1954) 
Clemente's professional baseball career began at age 18 when he accepted a contract from Pedrín Zorilla with Cangrejeros de Santurce ("Crabbers"), a winter league team and franchise of the Puerto Rican Professional Baseball League (LBPPR). Clemente signed with the team on October 9, 1952. He was a bench player during his first season but was promoted to the Cangrejeros' starting lineup the following season. During this season he hit .288 as the team's leadoff hitter.

While Clemente was playing in the LBPPR, the Brooklyn Dodgers offered him a contract with one of the team's Triple-A affiliates.

Minor league baseball (1954) 
After signing with the Dodgers on February 19, 1954, Clemente moved to Montreal to play with the Royals. Affected early on by both climate and language differences, Clemente received assistance from bilingual teammates such as infielder Chico Fernandez and pitchers Tommy Lasorda  and Joe Black.

Black was the original target of the Pittsburgh Pirates' June 1, 1954, scouting trip to Richmond. Conducted by pitching coach Clyde Sukeforth, the mission's focus quickly shifted when he witnessed Clemente's throwing and batting prowess in pre-game drills. Nonetheless, Clemente barely played during Sukeforth's three-day visit. With his suspicions further aroused by manager Max Macon's dismissive remarks ("You mean you want him?!") and the fact that Clemente took batting practice with the pitchers rather than his fellow position players, Sukeforth made inquiries and soon ascertained Clemente's status as an unprotected bonus baby. The manager had been instructed to use Clemente "sparingly," acknowledged Macon almost 12 years later. "We tried to sneak him through the draft, but it didn't work." As Sukeforth told Pirates beat writer Les Biederman, "I knew then he'd be our first draft choice." Before leaving Richmond, he recalled, "I told Montreal manager Max Macon to take good care of 'our boy' and see that he didn't get hurt."

Evidently, Macon took Sukeforth at his word; scarcely had the Pirate scout departed when, on June 4, Clemente started his first game in over a month. In the course of two days and three games (two of which he started), Clemente amassed ten at-bats, two more than in the previous thirty games combined. Yet just as abruptly, the moment was over and he was back to riding the bench, this time for almost two months.

Clemente's extra inning, walk-off home run of July 25, 1954, the first home run of his North American baseball career, was hit in his first at-bat after entering the game as a defensive replacement. Perhaps prompted by Sukeforth's followup visit ("I don't care if you never play him; we're going to finish last, and we're going to draft him number one"), Clemente's appearance ended a nearly two-month-long drought starting on June 6 (17 appearances, 6 starts, and 24 at-bats in 60 games). From this point forward, Clemente's playing time increased significantly; he started every subsequent game against a left-handed starting pitcher, finishing the season with a batting average of .257 in 87 games. Clemente would complement his July 25 walk-off homer with another on September 5, as well as a game-ending outfield assist (cutting down the potential tying run at the plate) on August 18, his 20th birthday. As promised, the Pirates made Clemente the first selection of the Rule 5 draft that took place on November 22, 1954.

Major League Baseball (1955–1972) 
For all but the first seven weeks of his major league career, Clemente wore number 21, so chosen because his full name of Roberto Clemente Walker had that many letters. After his death, this number was retired by the Pirates. For his first few weeks, Clemente wore the number 13, as his teammate Earl Smith was wearing number 21. It was later reassigned to Clemente.

During the off-seasons (except the 1958–59, 1962–63, 1965–66, 1968–69, 1971–72, and 1972–73 seasons), Clemente played professionally for the Santurce Crabbers, Criollos de Caguas, and San Juan Senadores in the Puerto Rican baseball winter league, where he was considered a star. He sometimes managed the San Juan team.

In September 1958, Clemente joined the United States Marine Corps Reserve. He served his six-month active duty commitment at Parris Island, South Carolina, Camp LeJeune in North Carolina, and Washington, D.C. At Parris Island, Clemente received recruit training with Platoon 346 of the 3rd Recruit Battalion. The rigorous Marine Corps training programs helped Clemente physically; he added strength by gaining ten pounds and said his back troubles (caused by being in a 1954 auto accident, see below) had disappeared. He was a private first class in the Marine Corps Reserve until September 1964.

Pittsburgh Pirates, 1950s 

The Pirates struggled through several difficult seasons through the 1950s. They did have a winning season in 1958, their first since 1948.

Clemente debuted with the Pirates on April 17, 1955, wearing uniform number 13, in the first game of a doubleheader against the Brooklyn Dodgers. Early in his career with the Pirates, he was frustrated by racial and ethnic tensions, with sniping by the local media and some teammates. Clemente responded to this by saying "I don't believe in color." He said that, during his upbringing, he was taught never to discriminate against someone based on ethnicity.

Clemente was at a double disadvantage, as he was a Latin American and Caribbean player whose first language was Spanish and was of partially African descent. The year before, the Pirates had hired Curt Roberts, their first African-American player. They were the fifth team in the NL and ninth in the major leagues to do so, seven years after Jackie Robinson broke baseball's color line by joining the Dodgers. When Clemente arrived in Pittsburgh, Roberts befriended him and helped him adjust to life in the major league, as well as in the Pittsburgh area.

During his rookie season, Clemente had to sit out several games, as he had suffered a lower back injury in Puerto Rico the previous winter. A speeding, drunk driver rammed into his car at an intersection.
He finished his rookie season with a .255 batting average, despite trouble hitting certain types of pitches. His defensive skills were highlighted during this season.

The following season, on July 25, 1956, in Forbes Field, Clemente hit the only documented walk-off, inside-the-park grand slam in modern MLB play. Pittsburgh-based sportswriter John Steigerwald said that it "may have been done only once in the history of baseball." [Emphasis added.])

Clemente was still fulfilling his Marine Corps Reserve duty during spring of 1959 and set to be released from Camp Lejeune until April 4. A Pennsylvania state senator, John M. Walker, wrote to US Senator Hugh Scott requesting an early release on March 4 so Clemente could join the team for spring training.

Pittsburgh Pirates, 1960s 

Early in the 1960 season, Clemente led the league with a .353 batting average, and the 14 extra-base hits and 25 RBIs recorded in May alone resulted in Clemente's selection as the National League's Player of the Month. His batting average would remain above the .300 mark throughout the course of the campaign. On August 5 at Forbes Field, Clemente crashed into the right-field wall while making a pivotal play, depriving San Francisco's Willie Mays of a leadoff, extra-base hit in a game eventually won by Pittsburgh, 1–0. The resulting injury necessitated five stitches to the chin and a five-game layoff for Clemente, while the catch itself was described by Giants beat writer Bob Stevens as "rank[ing] with the greatest of all time, as well as one of the most frightening to watch and painful to make." The Pirates compiled a 95–59 record during the regular season, winning the NL pennant, and defeated the New York Yankees in a seven-game World Series. Clemente batted .310 in the series, hitting safely at least once in every game. His .314 batting average, 16 home runs, and defensive playing during the course of the season had earned him his first spot on the NL All-Star roster as a reserve player, and he replaced Hank Aaron in right field during the 7th and 8th innings in the second All-Star game held that season (two All-Star games were held each season from 1959 through 1962).

During spring training in 1961, following advice from Pirates' batting coach George Sisler, Clemente tried to modify his batting technique by using a heavier bat to slow the speed of his swing.  During the 1961 season, Clemente was named the starting NL right fielder for the first of two All-Star games and went 2 for 4; he hit a triple on his first at-bat and scored the team's first run, then drove in the second with a sacrifice fly. With the AL ahead 4–3 in the 10th inning, he teamed with fellow future HOFers Hank Aaron, Willie Mays, and Frank Robinson to engineer a come-from-behind 5–4 NL victory, culminating in Clemente's walk-off single off knuckleballer Hoyt Wilhelm. Clemente started again in right field for the second All-Star game held that season and was 0 for 2, flying and grounding out in the 2nd and 4th innings. That season he received his first Gold Glove Award.

Following the 1961 season, he traveled to Puerto Rico along with Orlando Cepeda, who was a native of Ponce. When both players arrived, they were received by 18,000 people. During this time, he was also involved in managing the Senadores de San Juan of the Puerto Rican League, as well as playing with the team during the major league off-season. During the course of the winter league, Clemente injured his thigh while doing some work at home but wanted to participate in the league's all-star game. He pinch-hit in the game and got a single, but experienced a complication of his injury as a result, and had to undergo surgery shortly after being carried off the playing field. This condition limited his role with the Pirates in the first half of the 1965 season, during which he batted .257. Although he was inactive for many games, when he returned to the regular starting lineup, he got hits in 33 out of 34 games and his batting average climbed up to .340. He participated as a pinch hitter and replaced Willie Stargell playing left field during the All-Star Game on July 15.

Clemente was an All-Star every season he played in the 1960s other than 1968—the only year in his career after 1959 in which he failed to hit above .300—and a Gold Glove winner for each of his final 12 seasons, beginning in 1961. He won the NL batting title four times: 1961, 1964, 1965, and 1967, and won the league's MVP Award in 1966, hitting .317 with a career-high 29 home runs and 119 RBIs. In 1967, Clemente registered a career-high .357 batting average, hit 23 home runs, and batted in 110 runs. Following that season, in an informal poll conducted by Sport Magazine at baseball's Winter Meetings, a plurality of major league GMs declared Clemente "the best player in baseball today," edging out AL Triple Crown winner Carl Yastrzemski by a margin of 8 to 6, with one vote each going to Hank Aaron, Bob Gibson, Bill Freehan and Ron Santo.

In an effort to make him seem more American, sportswriters started calling him Bob or Bobby and his baseball cards even listed him as Bob Clemente.  He disliked the practice and asked that it be stopped.

Pittsburgh Pirates, 1970s 
The 1970 season was the last one that the Pirates played at Forbes Field before moving to Three Rivers Stadium; for Clemente, abandoning this stadium was an emotional situation. The Pirates' final game at Forbes Field occurred on June 28, 1970. That day, Clemente said that it was hard to play in a different field, saying, "I spent half my life there." The night of July 24, 1970, was declared "Roberto Clemente Night"; on this day, several Puerto Rican fans traveled to Three Rivers Stadium and cheered Clemente while wearing traditional Puerto Rican attire. A ceremony to honor Clemente took place, during which he received a scroll with 300,000 signatures compiled in Puerto Rico, and several thousands of dollars were donated to charity work following Clemente's request.

During the 1970 season, Clemente compiled a .352 batting average; the Pirates won the NL East pennant but were subsequently eliminated by the Cincinnati Reds. During the offseason, Roberto Clemente experienced some tense situations while he was working as manager of the Senadores and when his father, Melchor Clemente, experienced medical problems and underwent surgery.

In the 1971 season, the Pirates won the NL East, defeated the San Francisco Giants in four games to win the NL pennant, and faced the Baltimore Orioles in the World Series. Baltimore had won 101 games (third season in row with 100+ wins) and swept the American League Championship Series, both for the third consecutive year, and were the defending World Series champions. The Orioles won the first two games in the series, but Pittsburgh won the championship in seven games. This marked the second occasion that Clemente helped win a World Series for the Pirates. Over the course of the series, Clemente had a .414 batting average (12 hits in 29 at-bats), performed well defensively, and hit a solo home run in the deciding 2–1 seventh game victory. Following the conclusion of the season, he received the World Series Most Valuable Player Award.

3,000th career hit 

Although he was frustrated and struggling with injuries, Clemente played in 102 games and hit .312 during the 1972 season. He also made the annual NL All-Star roster for the twelfth time (he played in 14/15 All-Star games) and won his twelfth consecutive Gold Glove. On September 30, he hit a double in the fourth inning off Jon Matlack of the New York Mets at Three Rivers Stadium for his 3,000th hit. It was his last regular season at-bat of his career. By playing in right field in one more regular season game, on October 3, Clemente tied Honus Wagner's record for games played as a Pittsburgh Pirate, with 2,433 games played. In the NL playoffs that season, he batted .235 as he went 4 for 17. His last game was October 11, 1972 at Cincinnati's Riverfront Stadium in the fifth and final game of the 1972 NLCS. He and Bill Mazeroski were the last Pirate players remaining from the 1960 World Series championship team.

Personal life 
Clemente was married on November 14, 1964, to Vera Zabala at San Fernando Church in Carolina. The couple had three children: Roberto Jr., born in 1965, Luis Roberto, born in 1966, and Roberto Enrique, born in 1969. Vera Clemente died on November 16, 2019, aged 78.

Clemente was a devout Catholic.

In the 1958–59 off-season, Clemente enlisted in the United States Marine Corps, and served during off-seasons through 1964.  He was inducted into the Marine Corps Sports Hall of Fame in 2003, and into the Puerto Rican Veterans Hall of Fame 15 years later.

Charitable work and death 

Clemente spent much of his time during the off-season involved in charity work. When Managua, the capital city of Nicaragua, was affected by a massive earthquake on December 23, 1972, Clemente (who visited Managua three weeks before the quake) immediately set to work arranging emergency relief flights. He soon learned, however, that the aid packages on the first three flights had been diverted by corrupt officials of the Somoza government, never reaching victims of the quake. He decided to accompany the fourth relief flight, hoping that his presence would ensure that the aid would be delivered to the survivors. It crashed into the Atlantic Ocean off the coast of Isla Verde, Puerto Rico immediately after takeoff on December 31, 1972, due to engine failure.

A search and rescue effort was immediately launched, led by the USCGC Sagebrush. A few days after the crash, the body of the pilot and part of the fuselage of the plane were found. An empty flight case which apparently belonged to Clemente was the only personal item of his which was recovered from the plane. Clemente's teammate and close friend Manny Sanguillén was the only member of the Pirates who did not attend Roberto's memorial service. Instead, the Pirates catcher chose to dive into the waters where Clemente's plane had crashed in an effort to find his teammate. The bodies of Clemente and three others who were also on the four-engine plane were never recovered.

Montreal Expos pitcher Tom Walker, then playing winter league ball in Puerto Rico (in a league later named after Clemente), helped him load the plane. Because Clemente wanted Walker, who was single, to go and enjoy New Year's, Clemente told him not to join him on the flight.

In an interview for the ESPN documentary series SportsCentury in 2002, Clemente's widow Vera mentioned that Clemente had told her that he thought he was going to die young several times. Indeed, while he was being asked when he would get his 3,000th career hit by broadcaster and future fellow Hall of Famer Richie Ashburn in July 1971 during the All-Star Game activities, Clemente's response was "Well, uh, you never know. I, I, uh, if I'm alive, like I said before, you never know because God tells you how long you're going to be here. So you never know what can happen tomorrow." Clemente's older stepbrother, Luis, died on December 31, 1954, exactly 18 years before Clemente himself, and his stepsister died a few years later.

At the time of his death, Clemente had established several records with the Pirates, including most triples in a game (three) and hits in two consecutive games (ten). He won 12 Gold Glove Awards and shares the record of most won among outfielders with Willie Mays.  On July 25, 1956, in a 9–8 Pittsburgh win against the Chicago Cubs, Clemente hit the only walk-off inside-the-park grand slam in professional baseball history.

Hall of Fame
On March 20, 1973, the Baseball Writers' Association of America held a special election for the Baseball Hall of Fame. They voted to waive the waiting period for Clemente, due to the circumstances of his death, and posthumously elected him for induction into the Hall of Fame, giving him 393 out of 420 available votes, for 92.7% of the vote.

Clemente's Hall of Fame plaque originally had his name as "Roberto Walker Clemente" instead of the proper Spanish format "Roberto Clemente Walker"; the plaque was recast in 2000 to correct the error. Both plaques are currently on display in the Hall of Fame, the new one in the plaque gallery and the original in the “sandlot kids clubhouse” area.

MLB awards and achievements

Awards 
 NL MVP Award (1966)
 NL Player of the Month Award (May 1960, May 1967, July 1969)
 World Series MVP Award (1971)
 NL Gold Glove Award (1961–1972)
 Commissioner's Historic Achievement Award (2006)

Achievements 
 NL All-Star (1960–1967, 1969–1972)
 NL leader in batting average (1961, 1964, 1965, 1967)
 NL leader in hits (1964, 1967)
 NL leader in triples (1969)
 NL leader in putouts as right fielder (1958, 1961, 1966)
 NL leader in fielding average as right fielder and outfielder (1972)

Other honors and awards

 
Following his death, Clemente received numerous awards, recognitions and homages. Dozens of schools, streets, bridges, public parks, buildings and sports venues have been named in his honor. Clemente is the athlete with most statues and monuments dedicated in the world, with more than a dozen in several countries. 

In 2012, the Puerto Rico Professional Baseball League (LBPPR) was renamed Liga de Béisbol Profesional Roberto Clemente, the number 21 was also permanently retired. He had been inducted in several Hall of Fames for his performance on the field and also for his humanitarian as part of the World Sports Humanitarian Hall (1995). Clemente has been the subject of several documentaries, books and other media. 

The government of Puerto Rico recognizes Clemente as a prócer (or national hero) and he has received the Congressional Gold Medal, Presidential Citizens Medal and Presidential Medal of Freedom from the federal government of the United States. An initiative to have him canonized by the Catholic Church took place during the 2010s. 

In 2022, honoring 50 years since his passing, the MLB proclaimed September 15 as "Roberto Clemente Day".

Roberto Clemente Award
Since 1971, MLB has presented the Roberto Clemente Award (named the Commissioner's Award in 1971 and 1972) every year to a player with outstanding baseball playing skills who is personally involved in community work. A trophy and a donation check for a charity of the player's choice are presented annually at the World Series. A panel of three makes the final determination of the award recipient from an annual list of selected players.

See also

Hispanics in the United States Marine Corps
List of baseball players who died during their careers
List of Major League Baseball annual triples leaders
List of Major League Baseball career doubles leaders
List of Major League Baseball career home run leaders
List of Major League Baseball career runs batted in leaders
List of Major League Baseball career runs scored leaders
List of Major League Baseball career total bases leaders
List of Major League Baseball career triples leaders
List of Major League Baseball players who spent their entire career with one franchise
List of Pittsburgh Pirates home run leaders
List of players from Puerto Rico in Major League Baseball
List of Puerto Rican Presidential Citizens Medal recipients
List of Puerto Rican Presidential Medal of Freedom recipients

Notes

References

Further reading

Articles

 United Press. "Clemente's Toss helps Beat Toronto". The Montreal Gazette. August 19, 1954.
 Blazar, Burt. "Press Box". The Elmira Advertiser. November 23, 1954.
 Hernon, Jack. "Roamin' Around: The Kid They'll Talk About". Pittsburgh Post-Gazette. May 6, 1955.
 Biederman, Les. "Clemente Belts Tape-Measure Homer at Wrigley Field". The Sporting News. May 27, 1959.
 Cernkovic, Rudy (UPI). "Roberto Clemente Is Often Compared with Willie Mays". The Memphis World. May 28, 1960. 
 Fraley, Oscar (UPI). "3 Years Are Up and Clemente's At Top of Heap". The Milwaukee Sentinel. June 11, 1960.
 Cope, Myron. The Man in the Pirate Uniform: Clemente is Spectacular Player. Pittsburgh Post-Gazette. August 23, 1960. 
 Walfoort, Cleon. "Clemente New Kind of Bat Champion". The Milwaukee Journal. August 15, 1961. pp. 10, 11.
 Prato, Lou (AP). "Rival Pitchers Look Out! Clemente very sick man". The Oxnard Press-Courier. June 5, 1962.
 United Press International. "Named Captain". Desert Sun. August 20, 1963.
 Murray, Jim. "Roberto's Revenge". Los Angeles Times. July 1, 1964. Pt. III, pp. 1 and 6.
 Schuyler, Ed (AP). "Clemente Unorthodox? Well, He Gets Results". The Daytona Beach Morning Journal. August 11, 1964.
 Cope, Myron. "Aches and Pains and Three Batting Titles". Sports Illustrated.  March 7, 1966.
 Richman, Milton. "Roberto Clemente Tells Them All What's What". Desert Sun. March 11, 1966
 Biederman, Les. "Clemente Bombs Mets: Roberto Socks 500-Foot Homer". The Pittsburgh Press. March 25, 1966.
 Fitzgerald, Tommy. "Can't Hide Roberto". The Miami News. March 26, 1966.
 Biederman, Les. "The Scoreboard: Big Day For Two Pirates; Clemente's Friend Retrieves Ball; Longest Drive In Wrigley Field". The Pittsburgh Press. June 6, 1966.
 Biederman, Les. "Cards Survive Clemente's HR Blast; Roberto Raps 450-Footer In 4-2 Loss". The Pittsburgh Press. June 10, 1966.
 Chass, Murray (AP). "Donn Drags, Not Clemente". The Tuscaloosa News. June 14, 1966.
 Biederman, Les "Clemente 32 ... And Great". The Pittsburgh Press. August 18, 1966. 
 Feeney, Charley. "Roamin' Around: Is He Really the Great Roberto?". The Pittsburgh Post-Gazette. August 19, 1966.
 Couch, Dick (AP). "Clemente Waves Banner for Spanish-Speaking Players: Don't Get Due Recognition". The Sarasota Herald-Tribune. August 23, 1966. 
 Biederman, Les. "Roberto's Bat Softens Rivals; Clemente Clouts Clutch HR for 2,000th Hit". The Sporting News. September 17, 1966.
 United Press International. "UPI's All-Star Team: Two Orioles, One Dodger Named". Desert Sun. October 10, 1966
 Biederman, Les."Roberto's Rifle Wing Amazes Fans, Shoots Down Cards, Amazes Fans". The Sporting News. July 1, 1967. 
 Hano, Arnold. "Roberto Clemente, Baseball's Brightest Superstar". Boys' Life. March 1968.
 "The Strain of Being Roberto Clemente: A beaseball superstar frustrated by faint praise". Life. May 24, 1968.
 Richman, Milton. "Ailing Shoulder Bothers Roberto: Loves Baseball Too Much to Quit". Desert Sun. August 14, 1968.
 Wilson, John. "Standing Cheer for Roberto". The Sporting News. February 20, 1971.
 Young, Dick. "Dodgers' Rock Cost 'em Clemente". The Wilmington Journal. October 19, 1971.
 Abrams, Al. "Sidelights on Sports: I Remember Roberto". The Pittsburgh Post-Gazette. January 2, 1973. pp. 14, 17.
 Berkow, Ira (NEA). "Roberto Must Be Proud". The Hendersonville Times-News. March 22, 1974.
 Holsopple, Barbara. "Roberto Clemente Baffles Writers, Drama Misses Deadline". The Pittsburgh Press. July 19, 1974.
 Holsopple, Barbara. "Pittsburghers Plan TV Movie On Clemente". The Pittsburgh Press. August 2, 1978.
 Associated Press. "Clemente Series Renewed for Six Years". Desert Sun. March 11, 1985.
 Wulf, Steve. "December 31: ¡Arriba Roberto!". Sports Illustrated. December 28, 1992.
 Utterback, Debra. "Feature Film on Clemente Waits on Deck". The Beaver County Times. January 31, 1993.
 Robinson, Alan (AP). "Bonds Vs. Clemente: The Debate Continues". The Gainesville Sun. March 30, 1993.
 Wulf, Steve. 25 Roberto Clemente". Sports Illustrated. September 19, 1994.
 Uricchio, Marylynn. "Disney Interested in Clemente". Pittsburgh Post-Gazette. November 1, 1994.
 Thornley, Stew. "Roberto Clemente’s Entry into Organized Baseball: Was He Hidden in Montreal?". The National Pastime. 2006 (Rev. 2008). 
 Bojanowski, Mike. "Measuring The Longest Home Runs In Wrigley Field History; Just how long did those Roberto Clemente and Dave Kingman home runs go? Here's one way of measuring them". SB Nation. May 12, 2016.

Books

 Christine, Bill. Roberto! The Man…The Player…The Humanitarian…The Life and Times of Roberto Clemente. New York: Stadia Sports Publishing. 1973.
 Clemente Family, The. Clemente: The True Legacy of an Undying Hero. New York: Penguin Group. 2013.
 Hano, Arnold. Roberto Clemente, Batting King. New York: G. B. Putnam's Sons. 1968, 1973.
 Izenberg, Jerry. Great Latin Sports Figures. Garden City, NY: Doubleday & Company. 1976. 
 McEntire, Madison. Big League Trivia; Facts, Figures, Oddities, and Coincidences from our National Pastime. Bloomington, Indiana: AuthorHouse. IX and 53. .
 Maraniss, David. Clemente: The Passion and Grace of Baseball’s Last Hero. New York: Simon and Schuster. 2006.
 Markusen, Bruce. Roberto Clemente: The Great One. Champaign, IL: Sports Publishing. 1998.
 Mayoral, Luis. Aun Escucha Las Ovaciones. Carolina, PR: Ciudad Deportiva Roberto Clemente. 1987.
 Miller, Ira (UPI). Roberto Clemente. New York: Grosset and Dunlap. 1973.
 Musick, Phil. Who Was Roberto? A Biography of Roberto Clemente. New York: . 1974.
 Musick, Phil. Reflections on Roberto. Pittsburgh, PA: Pittsburgh Associates DBA. 1994.
 O'Brien, Jim.  Maz and the '60 Bucs. Pittsburgh, PA: James P. O'Brien Publishing. 1994.
 O'Brien, Jim.  Remember Roberto: Clemente Recalled by Teammates, Family, Friends and Fans. Pittsburgh, PA: James P. O'Brien Publishing. 1994.
 Santiago, Wilfred. 21: The Story of Roberto Clemente. Seattle, WA: Fantagraphics Books. 2011.
 Wagenheim, Kal. Clemente!. New York: Praeger Publishers. 1973.

External links

Roberto Clemente Foundation
1952 scouting report, Baseball Hall of Fame

Latino Sports Legends
Biography of Roberto Clemente, Society of American Baseball Research/ BioProject 
Roberto Clemente, Baseball-almanac]
Remarks at a Ceremony Honoring Roberto Clemente. May 14, 1973, The American Presidency Project – 
Roberto Clamente, Federal Bureau Investigation Records: The Vault

 
 

1934 births
1972 deaths

African-American Catholics
Cangrejeros de Santurce (baseball) players
Congressional Gold Medal recipients
Expatriate baseball players in Nicaragua
Gold Glove Award winners
Liga de Béisbol Profesional Roberto Clemente outfielders
Major League Baseball players from Puerto Rico
Major League Baseball players with retired numbers
Major League Baseball right fielders
Missing air passengers
Montreal Royals players
National Baseball Hall of Fame inductees
National League All-Stars
National League batting champions
National League Most Valuable Player Award winners
People from Carolina, Puerto Rico
Pittsburgh Pirates players
Presidential Citizens Medal recipients
Presidential Medal of Freedom recipients
Puerto Rican expatriate baseball players in Canada
Puerto Rican United States Marines
United States Marine Corps reservists
Victims of aviation accidents or incidents in 1972
Victims of aviation accidents or incidents in Puerto Rico
World Series Most Valuable Player Award winners